The Korean terms hyeong, pumsae, poomsae and teul (meaning "form" or "pattern") are all used to refer to martial arts forms that are typically used in Korean martial arts such as Taekwondo and Tang Soo Do.
 Hyeong is often romanized as hyung. This term is used primarily in earlier styles of taekwondo, often referred to as traditional taekwondo.
 Pumsae is often romanized as poomsae or poomse. This term is used primarily in Kukkiwon/WTF-style taekwondo.
 Teul is often romanized as tul. This term is used primarily in ITF-style taekwondo. 
A hyeong is a systematic, prearranged sequence of martial techniques that is performed either with or without the use of a weapon. In traditional dojangs (training halls), hyeong are used primarily as a form of interval training that is useful in developing mushin, proper kinetics and mental and physical fortitude.  Hyeong may resemble combat, but are artistically non-combative and woven together so as to be an effective conditioning tool. One's aptitude for a particular hyeong may be evaluated in competition. In such competitions, hyeong are evaluated by a panel of judges who base the score on many factors including energy, precision, speed, and control. In western competitions, there are two general classes of hyeong: creative and standard. Creative hyeong are created by the performer and are generally more acrobatic in nature and do not necessarily reflect the kinetic principles intrinsic in any martial system.

Summary table of taekwondo forms

Taekwondo forms

Traditional taekwondo forms

Beginning in 1946, shortly after the conclusion of the Japanese occupation of Korea, new martial arts schools called kwans were opened in Seoul. These schools were established by Korean martial artists who had studied primarily in Okinawa and China during the Japanese occupation. Accordingly, the martial arts practiced in the kwans was heavily influenced by  shotokan karate and Chinese martial arts, though elements of taekkyeon and gwonbeop were also incorporated.

Five of these kwans were established during the interval between World War II and the Korean War. During the Korean War, establishment of new schools was halted; at the conclusion of the war four new schools were established by students from the five original kwans. Collectively, these schools are referred to as the nine original kwans of taekwondo. Each kwan practiced its own style of martial art (the term taekwondo had not yet been coined) and employed their own set of forms. The majority of the forms used, however, derived from Shotokan karate. In many cases they were given new names. These forms are still used today in martial arts style such as Tang Soo Do, Soo Bahk Do, Moo Duk Kwan Taekwondo, and Chun Kuk Do. The article Karate kata lists many of the forms used in traditional taekwondo:

 Five Pyung Ahn forms are used in traditional taekwondo as relatively simple, introductory forms. These correspond to the five Pinan forms of Shotokan.
 Three Shotokan forms called Naihanchi are used, though sometimes they are called Chul-Gi forms when used in taekwondo.
 Shotokan form Bassai is sometimes called Pal-sek.
 Chintō is used under the name Jin-Do.
 Rōhai is used, sometimes under the name Lohai.
 Kūsankū is used under the name Kong-Sang-Koon.
 Enpi is used under the name Sei-shan.
 Jitte is used under the name Ship-soo.
 Gojūshiho is used under the name Oh-sip-sa-bo.

In addition to these Shotokan forms, Tang Soo Do and other traditional styles incorporate additional forms as well, many developed by Hwang Kee.

WTF/Kukkiwon Pumsae

Kukkiwon-style taekwondo (and thus the World Taekwondo Federation) uses the word pumsae for form.

Prior to 1971, Kukkiwon-style taekwondo used a series of eight forms called the palgwae forms for color-belt forms. The term "pal-gwae" refers to the eight trigrams associated with the I Ching hexagrams. Symbolically, each form in the palgwae series corresponds to one trigram. Subsequent to 1971, the palgwae forms were deprecated in favor of eight taegeuk forms. The term taegeuk refers to the principle of the "unity of opposites". Though the movements in the taegeuk forms are different from those of the palgwae forms, each taegeuk form is likewise associated with a corresponding I Ching trigram.

Kukkiwon-style taekwondo uses a series of nine forms for dan-level black belts; this series is called the yudanja series. The first form in the series, Koryo, was replaced by a new form of the same name in 1971, as part of the transition from the palgwae to taegeuk forms.

Color Belt forms 

Taegeuk Il Jang/Palgwe Il Jang
 The general meaning of this form and associated trigram is Yang, which represents Heaven and Light.  Also, this trigram has a relationship to South and Father. The first Taegeuk/Palgwe form is the beginning of all pumsaes, the "birth" of the martial artist into Taekwondo.  This pumsae should be performed with the greatness of Heaven.

Taegeuk Ee Jang/Palgae Ee Jang
 The associated trigram of this pumsae represents the Lake(joy, a calm sturdy spirit:).  Also, related to the symbol is South East and the relationship of the youngest daughter.  The movements of this Taegeuk/Palgwe are aimed to be performed believing that man has limitations, but that we can overcome these limitations. The Lake and its water symbolize the flowing and calm nature of the martial artist.   This form is to reflect those attributes.

Taegeuk Sam Jang/Palgae Sam Jang
 This trigram represents Fire.  Related to this symbol is also East and the relationship of the Second Daughter.  Fire contains a lot of energy. The symbol behind the fire is similar to the symbolism of the water in that both can aid and both can destroy. This form is intended to be performed rhythmically, with some outbursts of energy to reflect fire's rhythmic and energetic dualism.

Taegeuk Sa Jang/Palgae Sa Jang
This trigram represents Thunder.  Also, the trigram is strongly connected to northeast and the relationship of the Eldest son.  Thunder comes from the sky and is absorbed by the earth, thus, according to the beliefs of the I Ching, thunder is one of the most powerful natural forces. This pumsae is associated with power and the connection between the heavens and earth.  This pumsae is intended to be performed with power resembling the Thunder for which it is named.

Taegeuk O Jang/Palgae O Jang
The trigram associated with this pumsae represents Wind.  The trigram is also related to southwest and the relationship with an eldest daughter.  The I Ching promotes that wind is a gentle force, but can sometimes be furious, destroying everything in its path. As such, it is intended that this pumsae is performed like the wind: gently, but knowing the ability of mass destruction with a single movement.  The performer and audience should be aware of the duality of the form.

Taegeuk Yuk Jang/Palgae Yuk Jang
The trigram associated with this pumsae represents Water. Also, there is a relation to West and the relationship with a Second son.  The movements of this pumsae are intended to be performed like water; flowing, powerful and cleansing.  Sometimes standing still like water in a lake, sometimes thriving as a river, sometimes powerful like a waterfall. The water is to symbolize calm and cleansing, while also possessing the attribute of being violent and destructive.

Taegeuk Chil Jang/Palgae Chil Jang
The trigram associated with this pumsae represents a Mountain. Also, it represents the northwest and youngest son.  The symbolism behind the mountain is the indomitable and majestic nature that all mountains possess.  This pumsae is intended to be performed with the feeling that all movements are this majestic due to their unconquerable nature.

Taegeuk Pal Jang/Palgae Pal Jang
The trigram associated with this pumsae represents the Earth.  Also, there is a representation of North and Mother. The associated trigram of this pumsae is Yin.  Yin, here, represents the end of the beginning, the evil part of all that is good.  This being the last of the pumsae Taegeuk, it represents the end of the circle and the cyclic nature of the Earth.

Black belt forms 

Koryo - Koryo, or Goryeo, is the name of an old Korean Dynasty. The people from the Goryeo defeated the Mongolian aggressors. It is intended that their spirit is reflected in the movements of the pumsae Koryo. Each movement of this pumsae represents the strength and energy needed to control the Mongols. The line of direction is the shape of the Hanja for a "Scholar", learned man.
Keumgang - Keumgang means "diamond," symbolizing hardness.  Keumgang is also the name of the most beautiful mountain in Korea, as well as the Keumgang warrior, named by Buddha.  Thus, the themes of hardness, beauty, and pondering permeate this pumsae.
 Taebaek - The legendary Dangun founded a nation in Taebaek, near Korea's biggest mountain Baekdoo. Baekdoo is a known symbol for Korea. The definition of the word taebaek is literally "lightness". Every movement in this poomsae is intended to be not only be exact and fast, but with determination and hardness resembling the mountain Baekdoo, the origin of the nation of Korea.
 Pyongwon - The definition of Pyongwon is "stretch, vast plain." The name carries with it a connotation of being large and majestic.
 Sipjin - Sipjin stands for ten symbols of longevity, which are Sun, Moon, Mountain, Water, Stone, Pine tree, Herb of eternal youth, Turtle, Deer, and Crane. This pumsae represents the endless development and growth by the basic idea of the ten symbols of longevity and the decimal system.
 Jitae - This pumsae is derived from the meaning of the earth. All things evolve from and return to the earth, the earth is the beginning and the end of life, as reelected through the Yin and Yang.
 Cheonkwon - Cheonkwon literally means 'sky'. In the pumsae, the sky symbolizes the ruler of the universe. According to belief, it is mysterious, infinite and profound. The motions of Cheonkwon are full of piety, vitality and reverence.
 Hansu - This pumsae is derived from the fluidity of water which easily adapts within nature.  The symbol of the water repeats itself many times throughout all pumsae, hyeongs, and in martial arts in general.
 Ilyo - The state of spiritual cultivation in Buddhism is called 'Ilyo' which means 'oneness'. In Ilyo, body and mind, spirit and substance, "I" and "you" are unified. The ultimate ideal of the martial art and pumsae can be found in this state. It is a discipline in which every movement is concentrated on leaving all materialistics thoughts, obsessions and external influences behind.

ITF Ch'ang Hon forms 

Schools that follow the International Taekwon-Do Federation (ITF) tradition typically use the Chang Hon 창헌 (also called Chang Hun, Chang 'On or Chon-Ji) forms that were developed by Choi Hong Hi, Nam Tae Hi, Han Cha Kyo, Choi Chang Keun, Park Won Ha, Woo Jae Lim, Kim Bok Man and Cho Sang Min, and have their roots in the Oh Do Kwan. In addition, Kim J.C., Park Jong Soo, and Lee Byung Moo are thought to have developed four of the Ch'ang Hon patterns (Eui-Am, Moon-Moo, Yong-Gae & So-San) in 1968. Park Jung Tae, likely assisted by Choi Jung Hwa (General Choi's son), Michael McCormack (General Choi's son-in-law) and Lim Won Sup, is credited with developing the Juche pattern. Kong Young Il may have helped develop the Ch'ang Hon patterns as well. With the Oh Do Kwan in charge of the taekwondo training in the Korean military, the "Chang Hon hyeong" set of forms spread widely, and they are seen in many taekwondo organizations, including ITF-offshoots such as the Global Taekwondo Federation.

The pattern names below are shown with Revised Romanization spellings; however, the traditional spellings are shown in parentheses if they vary from the modern standard, since those patterns have long been known with those spellings.

Color Belt forms 

Cheon-Ji
천지 / 天地 – 19 movements

Literally, Cheon-Ji (or Chon-Ji) means "heaven and earth" and refers to the creation of the world or the beginning of human history, and thus is the initial pattern learned by the beginner. It consists of forearm low blocks and punches in the first part to represent earth, and inner forearm middle blocks and punches in the second part to denote heaven.  It does not use any kicks. The cross shaped diagram represents the four elements of the universe : fire, water, air and earth.

Dan-Gun
단군 / 檀君 – 21 movements

Dan-Gun is named after the holy Dangun, the legendary founder of Korea in 2333 BC. Unusually for a teul, all the punches in Dan-Gun are high section (at eye level), symbolizing Dangun scaling a mountain.

Do-San
도산 / 島山 – 24 movements

Do-San is a pseudonym of the patriot Ahn Chang-ho (1878–1938). The 24 movements represent his entire life, which he devoted to furthering education in Korea and the Korean independence movement.
(Note that Encyclopedia of TaeKwon-Do – 15 Volume Set – by General Choi Hong Hi states Dosan's birth year incorrectly as 1876)

Won-Hyo
원효 / 元曉 – 28 movements

This pattern is named after the noted monk Wonhyo who introduced Buddhism to the Silla Dynasty in the year 686 AD.

Yul-Gok
율곡 / 栗谷 – 38 movements

Yul-Gok is a pseudonym of a great philosopher and scholar Yi I (1536–1584) nicknamed the "Confucius of Korea". The 38 movements of this pattern refer to his birthplace on 38-degree latitude and the diagram of the pattern represents scholar.

Jung-Geun
중근 / 重根 – 32 movements

Jung-Geun (or Joong-Gun) is named after the patriot Ahn Joong-Gun who assassinated Itō Hirobumi, the first Japanese governor-general of Korea, known as the man who played the leading part in the Korea-Japan merger. There are 32 movements in this pattern to represent Mr Ahn's age when he was executed at Lui-Shung Prison in 1910.

Note: Ahn Jung-Geun was born on 16 July 1879 and was executed on 26 March 1910, so was in fact 30 years old at his death. (or 31 by Korean counting since in Korea newborns are considered to be 1 year old)

Toi-Gye
퇴계 / 退溪 – 37 movements

Toi-Gye is the pen name of the noted scholar Yi Hwang (16th century), an authority on neo-Confucianism. The 37 movements of the pattern refer to his birthplace on 37-degree latitude, the diagram represents "scholar" as in the Yul-Gok hyeong.

Hwa-Rang
화랑 / 花郎 – 29 movements

Hwa-Rang is named after the Hwarang youth group that originated under the Silla Dynasty roughly 1350 years ago. The group eventually became the driving force for the unification of the three Kingdoms of Korea. The 29 movements refer to the 29th infantry Division, where Taekwondo developed into maturity.

Chung-Mu
충무 / 忠武 – 30 movements

Chung-Mu (or Choong-Moo) was the name given to the great Admiral Yi Sun-sin of the Yi Dynasty. He was reputed to have invented the first armored battleship (kobukson) in 1592, which is said to be the precursor of the present day submarine. The reason this pattern ends with a left hand attack is to symbolize his regrettable death having no chance to show his unrestrained potentiality checked by the forced reservation of his loyalty to the King.

Black Belt forms 

Gwang-Gae
광개 / 廣開 – 39 movements

Gwang-Gae (or Kwang-Gae) is named after the famous Kwang-Gae-Toh-Wang, the 19th king of the Goguryeo Dynasty, who achieved the greatest territorial expansion including the greater part of Manchuria. The diagram of the form represents the expansion and recovery of lost territory. The 39 movements refer to the first two figures of 391AD, the year he came to the throne.

Po Eun
포은 / 圃隱 – 36 movements

Po Eun is the pseudonym of a loyal subject Jeong Mongju who was a distinguished scholar of neo-Confucianism during the Goryeo Dynasty. His poem "I would not serve a second master though I might be crucified a hundred times" is known to every Korean people. The diagram, which is simply a straight line represents his unerring loyalty to the king and his country.

Gye-Baek
계백 / 階伯 – 44 movements

The Gye-Baek (or Gae-Baek) hyeong has 44 Movements.  Gae-Baek is named after Gyebaek, a great general in the Baekje Dynasty. The diagram represents his severe and strict military discipline.

Eui-Am
의암 / 義菴 – 45 movements

Eui-Am is the pseudonym of Son Byong Hi, leader of the Korean independence movement on 1 March 1919. The 45 movements refer to his age when he changed the name of his religion from Dong Hak (oriental learning) to Chondogyo (Heavenly Way Religion) in 1905. The diagram represents his indomitable spirit, displayed while dedicating himself to the prosperity of his nation.

Chung-Jang
충장 / 忠壯 – 52 movements

Chung-Jang (or Choong-Jang) is the pseudonym given to General Kim Duk Ryang who lived during the Yi Dynasty, 14th century. This pattern ends with a left hand attack to symbolize the tragedy of his death at 27 in prison before he was able to reach full maturity.

Juche
주체 / 主體 – 45 movements

The Juche hyeong has 45 movements. Juche is a philosophical idea that man is the master of everything and decides everything. In other words, the idea that man is that master of the world and his own destiny. It is said that this idea was rooted in Baekdu Mountain, which symbolize the spirit of the Korean people. The diagram represents Baekdu Mountain, which is the highest mountain in Korea.

Go-Dang
고당/古堂 – 39 movements

Go-Dang (or Ko-Dang) was one of the original 24 patterns created by General Choi. In the early 1980s, however, Kodang was removed from the official syllabus by General Choi and replaced by a new pattern which he named Juche. Go-Dang was a famous South Korean anti-communist, and when Choi began to spread his art throughout the world, and to North Korea in particular, he removed this pattern so as not to offend anyone. Although no longer part of official ITF Taekwondo, Kodang is still included in the syllabi of many Taekwondo organisations. In those organisations where it is still taught, it is generally taught to students at the level of second dan black belt. It consists of a sequence of 39 individual techniques. Although some sources lead to the deduction that Kodang is exactly the same pattern as Juche, they are in fact two completely different patterns. The confusion arose when one of the ITF Taekwondo groups changed the name of the pattern Juche to Kodang in 2008, because the word "Juche" is associated with North Korea's communist ideology.

Sam-Il
삼일 / 三一 – 33 movements

Sam-Il name refers to the historic March 1st Movement, the biggest nationwide Korean independence movement against the imperial Japan in 1919. The 33 movements in the pattern represent for the 33 patriots who planned the movement.

Yu-Sin
유신 / 庾信 – 68 movements

Yu-Sin (or Yoo-Sin) is named after General Kim Yu-Sin, a commanding general during the Silla Dynasty who played an important role in the merger of Goguryeo and Baekje by Silla. The 68 movements refer to the last two figures of 668 AD the year the three kingdoms were unified. The ready posture signifies a sword drawn to the right rather than the left side, symbolizing Yoo Sin's mistake of following his king's orders to fight with foreign forces (Tang Dynasty of China) against his own people (Goguryeo and Baik-je).

Choe-Yeong
최영 / 崔榮 – 45 movements

Choe-Yeong (or Choi-Yong) is named after General Choe Yong, Premier and Commander-in Chief of the armed forces during the 14th century Goryeo Dynasty. Choi Yong was greatly respected for his loyalty, patriotism, and humility. He was executed by subordinate commanders headed by General Yi Seonggye, who later became the first king of the Joseon Dynasty.

Yeon-Gae
연개 / 淵蓋 – 49 movements

Yeon-Gae (or Yon-Gae) is named after the famous general Yon Gae Somoon during the Goguryeo Dynasty. He defended Goguryeo from the aggression of the Tang Dynasty by destroying nearly 300,000 of their troops at Ansi Sung. (This pattern normally resides between Choi Yong and Se-Jong)

Eul-Ji
을지 / 乙支 – 42 movements

Eul-Ji (or Ul-Ji) is named after general Eulji Mundeok who successfully defended Goguryeo against a Sui invasion force of over one million soldiers led by Yang Je in 612AD.  By employing hit and run guerilla tactics, he was able to destroy the majority of the force. The diagram of the hyeong represents his surname. The 42 movements represent the author's age when he designed the pattern.

Mun-Mu
문무 / 文武 – 61 movements

Mun-Mu (or Moon-Moo) honors King Munmu, the 30th king of the Silla Dynasty, who completed the unification of the three kingdoms (Goguryeo, Baik-je, Silla). His body was buried near Dae Wang Am (Great King's Rock). According to his will, the body was placed in the sea "Where my soul shall forever defend my land against the Japanese". The 61 movements in this pattern symbolize the last two figures of 661 AD when Munmu came to the throne. (This pattern normally resides between Choi Yong and Sea-Jong)

Seo-San
서산 / 西山 – 72 movements

Seo-San (or So-San) is the pseudonym of the great monk Choi Hyon Ung during the Joseon Dynasty. The 72 movements refer to his age when he organized a corps of monk soldiers with the assistance of his pupil Sa Myung Dang. The monk soldiers helped repulse the Japanese who overran most of the Korean peninsula in 1592 during the Imjin War. (This pattern normally resides between Choi Yong and Sea-Jong) Seo-San is the longest of all Taekwon-do patterns.

Se-Jong
세종 / 世宗 – 24 movements

This pattern is named after Se-Jong who was the 4th King of the Yi Dynasty. He was known for his many great achievements in domestic and foreign affairs, diplomacy, scientific advancements, defense matters and culture. His most remarkable achievement was his invention of "Hangeul", the Korean Alphabet. The 24 movements of this pattern represent the 24 letters of the "Hangeul".

Tong-Il
통일 / 統一 – 56 movements

Tong-Il means "unification" which is the ultimate goal of all Koreans. Korea used to be one country, but was divided into North and South Korea in 1945 by the ideological conflict between the USSR and the US after World War II. Yon Mu Sun, the diagram of this pattern symbolizes the North and South becoming one.

GTF forms 

The Global Taekwondo Federation (GTF) is an offshoot of the International Taekwondo Federation (ITF). It was founded by Park Jung Tae in 1990.  The GTF practices Choi's ITF Patterns, but in addition Park added six new patterns. GTF uses the original ITF form Ko-Dang, but never its replacement, Juche.

Color Belt forms 

 Jee-Sang - "JEE" means earth- representing the foundation of the world, "SANG" means above the earth- representing the spirit of the GTF. The 24 movements signify the 24 hours of every day that we learn, connect with each other, gain insight, knowledge and wisdom. The 4 directions in this pattern represent our inner compass.. with it we will never lose our way. When we connect the "JEE" and the "SANG" we connect the heaven and earth to create an invisible strength that lives on. [24 moves]
 Dhan-Goon - DHAN-GOON named after the founder of Korea. The 23 movements in this pattern represent the first two digits of the year 2333 B.C. when, according to legend, Korea was born. This is Park's progressive interpretation of the traditional Taekwon-Do pattern of the same name. [23 moves]

Black Belt forms 

 Jee-Goo - Means "Global". The "X" shape of the form symbolizes crossing out the years of political strife in TaeKwon-Do that has been evident worldwide. The first movement symbolizes the beginning of the new Global TaeKwon-Do Movement – a concept of global peace and harmony. The 30 movements of the pattern are composed of three numbers (24, 4, 2) which explain the purpose. There are 24 hours in each day; therefore this concept will be with us every second. The four directions of movements represent the north, south, east and west encompassing all nations and all people. The four directions are done two times to reinforce our commitment to bring global peace and harmony to the world. [30 moves]
 Jook-Am - Is a pseudonym for Park. Jook means bamboo which shoots up straight forward without any curvature, its roots intertwining to form an inseparable force. Am is an immovable boulder from which the bamboo plants its roots to form an unshakeable foundation. This pattern represents Park's life and his constant struggle for perfection. The diagram is a representation of a bamboo shooting up from the boulder. This pattern's 95 movements (112 including combinations) symbolizes the year 1995 in which Jook-Am was created.
 Pyong-Hwa - Pyong Hwa means "Peace". Park dedicates this pattern for the 50 countries which found the UNO in San Francisco ( USA ) on year 1950 after the second World War. [50 moves]
 Sun-Duk - This pattern is named after Queen Sun Duk of the Silla dynasty 668 A.D.,who was known for bringing martial art from China to Korea. The diagram represents "Lady". The 68 movements of this pattern refer to the year 668 A.D. [68 moves]

Jhoon Rhee forms 

Jhoon Rhee Taekwondo or Jhoon Rhee's Martial Arts Ballet is the style of taekwondo developed by taekwondo pioneer Jhoon Rhee and overseen by the organization Jhoon Rhee International. The Jhoon Rhee-style of taekwondo originally used traditional taekwondo forms, then switched to ITF-style forms, then switched again to a set of forms developed by Jhoon Rhee. As a lover of dance and music, and someone who believed that the human form is the greatest of all works of art, Rhee wondered what it would be like to add music to the choreographed body movements of Tae Kwon Do, similar to the way that music is used in Olympic skating, ballroom dancing, and gymnastic floor exercise routines. Rhee choreographed several dances in ballet style, based on Tae Kwon Do moves, and set them to classical music, including Beethoven's Fifth Symphony and the theme from Exodus. The result of Rhee's invention—martial arts ballet—became the foundation for the musical forms competitions that are now popular at many martial arts tournaments in the U.S. The new art form has also found its way to Europe and Russia.

Beginner forms (White Belt) 

Kamsah – Appreciation Form
Kyu-Yool – Discipline Form (a drill you must perform if you are late to class, etc.)

Color Belt forms 

Jayoo – meaning "Freedom" (Gold or Yellow belt) "Stars and Stripes Forever"
Chosang – meaning "Ancestors" (Orange belt), performed to "God Bless America"
Hanguk – meaning "Korea" (Green belt), performed to "Aegukga"
Jung-Yi – meaning "Justice" (Purple belt)
Pyung-Wa – meaning "Peace" (Blue belt)
Meegook – meaning "America" (Red belt), performed to "Star-Spangled Banner"
Chashin – meaning "Confidence" (2nd Brown)
Might for Right (1st Brown), performed to "Exodus"

Black Belt forms 

Marriage of East and West (1st Black) "Beethoven's Fifth Symphony"
Beauty of Mexico (2nd Black) "Granada"

Jhoon Rhee Taekwondo uses ITF forms as its higher dan-level (Black Belt) forms

ATA Songahm forms 

The American Taekwondo Association (ATA) was founded in 1969 in Omaha, Nebraska by Haeng Ung Lee, a former Traditional Taekwondo instructor in the South Korean military. Songahm taekwondo is the style of martial arts practiced at ATA affiliated schools. Songahm means "Pine Tree and Rock." According to the ATA, the term Songahm itself represents "Evergreen strength the year round, long life and a symbol of unchanging human loyalty" as represented by the pine tree and the rock.

Color belts forms

Songahm 1 – 18 moves
Songahm 2 – 23 moves
Songahm 3 – 28 moves
Songahm 4 – 31 moves
Songahm 5 – 34 moves
In Wha 1 – 44 moves
In Wha 2 – 42 moves
Choong Jung 1 – 44 moves
Choong Jung 2 – 46 moves

Black Belts forms

Shim  – 1 Jun Dan, 81 moves
Jung Yul – 2nd Dan, 82 moves
Chung San – 3rd Dan, 83 moves
Sok Bong – 4th Dan, 84 moves
Chung Hae – 5th Dan, 95 moves
Jhang Soo – 6th Dan, 96 moves
Chul Joon – 7th Dan, 97 moves
Jeong Seung – 8th Dan, 98 moves

Tang Soo Do forms 
There are several different Tang Soo Do organizations around the world, but they generally follow a similar course with regard to hyeong. Most Tang Soo Do hyeong are related by borrowing from Japanese/Okinawan kata, with the names often directly translated from the Japanese.

Gicho/Kicho

Some schools teach new students the gicho/kicho, "basic," hyeong:

 (Kicho) Hyeong Il Bu (as taught by Shin, Kyung Sun of Military Arts Institute in Chicago, IL., is different from most Tang Soo Do organizations)
 (Kicho) Hyeong Ee Bu (as taught by Shin, Kyung Sun of Military Arts Institute in Chicago, IL., is different from most Tang Soo Do organizations)
 (Kicho) Hyeong Sam Bu (as taught by Shin, Kyung Sun of Military Arts Institute in Chicago, IL., is different from most Tang Soo Do organizations)
 (Kicho) Hyeong Sa Bu (as taught by Shin, Kyung Sun of Military Arts Institute in Chicago, IL.)
 (Kicho) Hyeong Oh Bu (as taught by Shin, Kyung Sun of Military Arts Institute in Chicago, IL.)

The Kicho hyeong are extremely similar to the Taikyoku kata developed by Yoshitaka Funakoshi (son of the Japanese karate master Gichin Funakoshi). The embusen used are the same, the stances are the Tang Soo Do equivalent, and the blocks and strikes are virtually identical. There is great reason to believe that Hwang Kee based his Korean Kicho hyeong on the Japanese Taikyoku kata.

The Kicho hyeong were developed as a basic, simple form for beginners. The symbol used in Tang Soo Do for the Kicho hyeong is a human baby learning to walk. The pattern is also visible in the increasingly complex forms that follow. Hwang Kee used these forms to teach applications of basic moves and techniques. These forms are also influenced by the Wa Ka Ryu style of southern China. These and the Pyung Ahn forms to follow are characterized by speed, aggressiveness, dynamic action, and quick reaction.

In the 1970s, Chuck Norris added new versions of the Giecho Hyung to his American Tang Soo Do system. Giecho Hyung Il Bu still resembles the original Korean/Japanese version, but Yi (Ee) Bu and Sahm Bu have been modified. Norris created advanced versions of Il Bu and Yi Bu, by adding kicks, reverse punches and switching between forward and back stances.

Sae Kye 
The World Tang Soo Do Association has modified the Kicho Hyeong, adding some kicks to it: These are the very first forms you learn if you are a part of World Tang Soo Do Association,(WTSDA).
 Sae Kye Hyeong Il Bu
 Sae Kye Hyeong E Bu 
 Sae Kye Hyeong Sam Bu

Pyong Ahn
The Pyong Ahn hyung are a series of five forms cognate in many ways to the pinan kata series of karate. They were reorganized by Master Itosu, an Okinawan practitioner of Tote and mentor of Funakoshi Gichin. They were originally a single form called Jae Nam (Channan). To make them easier to learn and safer for younger practitioners, the form was divided, and the more dangerous and lethal techniques were removed.  These newly organized hyung were designed as training forms to prepare for Kong Sang Koon (Kusanku). For a more comprehensive description of these hyung see Pinan Kata.

 Pyong Ahn Cho Dan - The first of the Pyong Ahn series that most practitioners learn, much of this form is a combination of gicho hyung il bu and ee bu. This form also employs low knife-hand blocks (ha dan soodo mahkkee). It is also the first hyung to incorporate multiple techniques per count (the low block/middle knife hand block combination).
 Pyong Ahn Ee Dan - This hyeong is one count/technique longer than the other low-rank forms, due to one of its techniques, a side kick (yup podo chagi), which is performed in two counts, the first to set up and the second to deliver. It is also one of the few low-level hyung to have a kihap (yell) on the last move. Most forms feature their kihaps between the first and last techniques.  The most-often used technique in this hyung is the middle knife-hand block in a back stance (hugul choong dan soodo mahkkee).
 Pyong Ahn Sam Dan - The third of the pyong ahn forms, this is also the shortest. While the forms before it involve an I-structure for movement, this form instead goes along an inverted T-structure, cutting out several counts. Its series of outside-inside kicks (pahkeso ahnuro chagi) to sideways elbow blocks (palkoom mahkkee) and hammerfist strikes (kwondo kong kyuk) is its most recognizable feature. It also ends with a kihab.
 Pyong Ahn Sa Dan - This form starts out much like Pyong Ahn Ee Dan, except that where Pyong Ahn Ee Dan has closed fists on its first blocks, Pyong Ahn Sa Dan has open hands. It is cognate to the Shotokan kata Pinan Yondan.
 Pyong Ahn O Dan - Cognate to Pinan Godan, this is the final hyung of the series, as well as the most involved. Its key features are cross-legged stances (kyo charip jaseh) and a jump followed by a double arm X low block (song soo hadan mahkkee).

The phrase "pyong ahn" is often translated as "balance and security." These forms are usually taught after the gicho hyung.  These forms were reorganized from their original form(called "Jae-Nam") in approximately 1870. In their original state they are run in sequence starting with the second form Pyong Ahn Ee Dan, to Pyong Ahn Cho Dan, and then to Pyong Ahn Sam Dan, Pyong Ahn Sa Dan, and Pyong Ahn O Dan, an order different from the order they are learned.  Though designed as open hand forms (weaponless), their versatility allows weapon application very easily.  Common adaptations include the sai, chool bong (nunchaku), and chung bong (middle staff). These forms show the influence of the southern China martial art style.

The Pyung Ahn hyung can be represented by the tortoise. The tortoise is well balanced, calm, and peaceful (pyung) and it carries its "home" on its back in the form of its shell.  These forms are meant as a means of defense and should promote security (ahn).  Also like the tortoise, they are meant to inspire longevity through both balance and security.

Naihanchi/Naebojin/Keema
The Keema hyeong series are borrowed from the naihanchi series of karate, and in fact some schools use the name Naihanchi for these forms. The level at which they are taught varies, but their difficulty and technicality means that they are most often reserved for red/black belts, though not always directly after each other. Hwang Kee assigned the Horse to represent the form. They are:

Naihanchi Cho Dan
Naihanchi Ee Dan
Naihanchi Sam Dan

Bassai/Passai/Palche/Bal Sak

The "Bassai" pattern, meaning "to penetrate a fortress," has cognates in both Chinese, Japanese and Korean martial arts. Moreover, there are many variations upon the two Bassai hyeong present in Tang Soo Do, Bassai(Palche) So and Bassai(Palche) Deh. Some schools only practice Palche De, the "greater" of the two forms. These are usually higher-belt forms. The animal these forms represent is the snake.

Kong Sang Koon

Sip Soo/Ship Soo

Meaning "Ten Hands," Ship Soo (or Sip Soo, depending on the Romanization) is cognate to the karate kata Jitte, though there are differences. Traditionally, this hyeong contains only hand techniques (its name can be taken to mean "all hands"), but some styles of Tang Soo Do do include kicking techniques. Its variations are many, and depend on the school, as with all hyeong. This form supposedly represents the bear.

Chinto/Jindo/Jinte

Jinte is a typically high-rank hyeong, whose hanja can be read as "Battle East". The hyeong requires balance with one legged techniques, and is often seen at tournament hyeong competitions.

ITF Tang Soo Do refers to the form as Jintae, instead of Chinto or Jindo.

Chil Sung and Yuk Ro

These two series of hyeong were created by Hwang Kee, who founded the Moo Duk Kwan organization. Chil Sung literally means "Seven Stars" in Korean. These are presumably represented by the seven forms of the series. "Yuk" meaning "six" and "Ro" means "Path". These forms represent the "six paths" taken in connecting the Physical, Mental, and Spiritual in Tang Soo Do/ Soo Bahk Do.

Chil Sung series:

 Chil Sung Il Ro
 Chil Sung Ee Ro
 Chil Sung Sam Ro
 Chil Sung Sa Ro
 Chil Sung O Ro
 Chil Sung Yuk Ro
 Chil Sung Chil Ro

Yuk Ro series:

 Yuk Ro Cho Dan (Du Mun)
 Yuk Ro Ee Dan (Joong Jol)
 Yuk Ro Sam Dan (Po Wol)
 Yuk Ro Sa Dan (Yang Pyun)
 Yuk Ro O Dan (Sahl Chu)
 Yuk Ro Yuk Dan (Choong Ro)

See also
Korean martial arts
Kata
Karate kata
Taeguk (Taekwondo)

References
 

Taekwondo
Korean martial arts
Kata